Rhytida patula is a species of medium-sized, air-breathing land snail, a terrestrial pulmonate gastropod mollusc in the family Rhytididae.

Distribution 
This species occurs in New Zealand

Life cycle 
Dimensions of eggs of Rhytida patula are 2.75 × 2.5, 3 × 2.25, 2.5 × 2, 3 × 2.5, 3 × 2.25, 3 × 2.25 mm.

References

Rhytida
Taxa named by Frederick Hutton (scientist)
Gastropods described in 1883
Gastropods of New Zealand
Endemic fauna of New Zealand
Endemic molluscs of New Zealand